Kamla Nehru Mahavidyalaya or the Kamla Nehru College (known as the K.N. College) is a degree college located in Korba, Chhattisgarh, India. It was established by the Kamla Nehru Mahavidyalaya Samiti in 1971.

History
Established in 1971, it was affiliated to Pandit Ravishankar Shukla University, Raipur and started its journey with 250 Undergraduate students in Faculty of Arts. The postgraduate program also started in Hindi and Economics (1983), Geography (1989). In 1984, the college became affiliated to newly formed Guru Ghasidas University, Bilaspur. Faculty of Commerce started in 1992 and Faculty of Science was started in 1999. After the establishment of Atal Bihari Vajpayee Vishwavidyalaya in 2012, the college became affiliated to Atal Bihari Vajpayee Vishwavidyalaya, Bilaspur.

Course
Bachelor of Arts
Bachelor of Science
Bachelor of Computer Application
Bachelor of Library Science
Bachelor of Commerce
Bachelor of Business Administration
Master of Arts
Master of Science
Master of Commerce
Postgraduate Diploma in Computer Application
Postgraduate Diploma in Business Management
Master of Library and Information Science

See also
Durga Mahavidyalaya, Raipur

References

External links
 

Universities and colleges in Chhattisgarh
Colleges affiliated to Atal Bihari Vajpayee Vishwavidyalaya
Korba, Chhattisgarh
Educational institutions established in 1971
1971 establishments in Madhya Pradesh